Blatobulgium was a Roman fort, located at the modern-day site known as Birrens, in Dumfriesshire, Scotland.

Name
Blatobulgium is recorded in the Antonine Itinerary. The name derives from the Brittonic roots *blāto- 'bloom, blossom' or *blāto- (from earlier *mlāto-), 'flour' and *bolgo-, 'bag, bulge'. The name may mean 'flowery hillock' or 'flowery hollow'. However, as there are granaries at the fort, Blatobulgium may be a nickname meaning 'Flour Sacks'.

History
The fort formed the northern terminus of the Roman-era Watling Street (using an extended definition of this road), or more simply Route 2 of the Antonine Itinerary. It was located in the territory of the Selgovae.

Birrens was first occupied in the Flavian period from AD 79 onwards, when its internal buildings were presumably of timber. Under Hadrian, soon after AD 122,  a new fort was constructed whose central buildings were probably of stone.  However the visible fort and its internal buildings date from the Antonine period around AD 142.  They were destroyed perhaps by enemy action around AD 155, but the replacement stone buildings in the second Antonine period dating to AD 159 onwards were of much poorer quality. Occupation lasted until about AD 180–84. There appear to be no finds later than the Antonine period.

Finds
There have been more inscribed and sculptured stones found at Birrens than anywhere else in Scotland.
An altar stone dedicated to the Celtic goddess Ricagambeda was found at Birrens.

References

History of Dumfriesshire
Roman auxiliary forts in Scotland
Scheduled monuments in Scotland